In Greek mythology, Aeson (Ancient Greek: Αἴσων Aísōn) was a king of Iolcus in Thessaly.  He was the father of the hero Jason.  According to one version of the story, he was imprisoned by his half-brother Pelias, and when Pelias intended to kill him he committed suicide.  In another story, he was killed by Jason's wife Medea, who brought him back to life as a young man.

Family 
Aeson was the son of Cretheus and Tyro. He had two brothers Pheres and Amythaon. Through his mother Tyro who consorted with the sea god Poseidon, he had two half-brothers, Neleus and Pelias.

Aeson was the father of Jason and Promachus with Alcimede, daughter of Phylacus and Clymene. Other sources say the mother of his children was (1) Polymede or Polymele, or Polypheme a daughter of Autolycus, (2) Amphinome, (3) Theognete, daughter of Laodicus, (4) Rhoeo or (5) Arne or (6) Scarphe.

Mythology 
Pelias was power-hungry and he wished to gain dominion over all of Thessaly. To this end, he banished Neleus and Pheres and locked Aeson in the dungeons in Iolcus. Aeson sent Jason to Chiron to be educated while Pelias, afraid that he would be overthrown, was warned by an oracle to beware of a man wearing one sandal.

Many years later, Pelias was holding the Olympics in honor of Poseidon when Jason, rushing to Iolcus, lost one of his sandals in a river while helping Hera, in the form of an old woman, cross.  When Jason entered Iolcus, he was announced as a man wearing one sandal. Suspicious, Pelias asked him what he (Jason) would do if confronted with the man who would be his downfall. Jason responded that he would send that man after the Golden Fleece. Pelias took that advice and sent Jason to retrieve the Golden Fleece.

During Jason's absence, Pelias intended to kill Aeson. However, Aeson committed suicide by drinking bull's blood. His wife killed herself as well, and Pelias murdered their infant son Promachus.

Alternatively, he survived until Jason and his new wife, Medea, came back to Iolcus. She slit Aeson's throat, then put his corpse in a pot and Aeson came to life as a young man. She then told Pelias' daughters she would do the same for their father. They slit his throat and Medea refused to raise him, so Pelias stayed dead.

Gallery

Notes

References 

 Apollodorus, The Library with an English Translation by Sir James George Frazer, F.B.A., F.R.S. in 2 Volumes, Cambridge, MA, Harvard University Press; London, William Heinemann Ltd. 1921. ISBN 0-674-99135-4. Online version at the Perseus Digital Library. Greek text available from the same website.
 Apollonius Rhodius, Argonautica translated by Robert Cooper Seaton (1853-1915), R. C. Loeb Classical Library Volume 001. London, William Heinemann Ltd, 1912. Online version at the Topos Text Project.
 Apollonius Rhodius, Argonautica. George W. Mooney. London. Longmans, Green. 1912. Greek text available at the Perseus Digital Library.
 Diodorus Siculus, The Library of History translated by Charles Henry Oldfather. Twelve volumes. Loeb Classical Library. Cambridge, Massachusetts: Harvard University Press; London: William Heinemann, Ltd. 1989. Vol. 3. Books 4.59–8. Online version at Bill Thayer's Web Site
 Diodorus Siculus, Bibliotheca Historica. Vol 1-2. Immanel Bekker. Ludwig Dindorf. Friedrich Vogel. in aedibus B. G. Teubneri. Leipzig. 1888–1890. Greek text available at the Perseus Digital Library.
 Gaius Julius Hyginus, Fabulae from The Myths of Hyginus translated and edited by Mary Grant. University of Kansas Publications in Humanistic Studies. Online version at the Topos Text Project.
 Gaius Valerius Flaccus, Argonautica translated by Mozley, J H. Loeb Classical Library Volume 286. Cambridge, MA, Harvard University Press; London, William Heinemann Ltd. 1928. Online version at theio.com.
 Gaius Valerius Flaccus, Argonauticon. Otto Kramer. Leipzig. Teubner. 1913. Latin text available at the Perseus Digital Library.
 Hesiod, Catalogue of Women from Homeric Hymns, Epic Cycle, Homerica translated by Evelyn-White, H G. Loeb Classical Library Volume 57. London: William Heinemann, 1914. Online version at theio.com
 Publius Ovidius Naso, Metamorphoses translated by Brookes More (1859-1942). Boston, Cornhill Publishing Co. 1922. Online version at the Perseus Digital Library.
 Publius Ovidius Naso, Metamorphoses. Hugo Magnus. Gotha (Germany). Friedr. Andr. Perthes. 1892. Latin text available at the Perseus Digital Library.

External links 
 

Kings of Iolcus
Kings in Greek mythology
Metamorphoses characters
Thessalian characters in Greek mythology
Suicides in Greek mythology